Ludwig, Hereditary Prince of Mecklenburg-Schwerin (6 August 172512 September 1778) was heir to the Dukedom of Mecklenburg-Schwerin for twenty-two years from 1756 to his death in 1778. He was also the father of the first Grand Duke of Mecklenburg-Schwerin, Frederick Francis I.

Early life
Louis was born at Grabow, Mecklenburg-Schwerin, third child and second son of Christian Ludwig II, Duke of Mecklenburg-Schwerin (1683–1756), (son of Frederick, Duke of Mecklenburg-Grabow and Landgravine Christine Wilhelmine of Hesse-Homburg) and his wife, Duchess Gustave Caroline of Mecklenburg-Strelitz (1694–1748), (daughter of Adolphus Frederick II, Duke of Mecklenburg-Strelitz and Duchess Marie of Mecklenburg-Güstrow).

After the death of the father in 1756, his brother Frederick succeed to the Dukedom. Since his brother died without any surviving issue he was appointed heir, but he died in 1778, and at the death of his brother in 1785 his son Frederick Francis, succeeded as the Duke of Mecklenburg-Schwerin who later became the Grand Duke of Mecklenburg-Schwerin.

Marriage
Louis married 13 May 1755 at Schwerin to Princess Charlotte Sophie of Saxe-Coburg-Saalfeld (1731–1810), daughter of Francis Josias, Duke of Saxe-Coburg-Saalfeld, and his wife, Princess Anna Sophie of Schwarzburg-Rudolstadt.

They had one son and one daughter:
 Frederick Francis I, Grand Duke of Mecklenburg-Schwerin (10 December 1756 – 1 February 1837); married in 1775 Princess Louise of Saxe-Gotha-Altenburg, had issue.
 Duchess Sophia Frederica of Mecklenburg-Schwerin (24 August 1758 – 29 November 1794); married in 1774 to Frederick, Hereditary Prince of Denmark and Norway, had issue.

Ancestry

References

Bibliography
 Genealogisches Handbuch des Adels, Fürstliche Häuser, Reference: 1956
 Het Groothertogelijk Huis Mecklenburg, Bergen-op-Zoom, 1901–1902, Juten, W. J. F., Reference: 106

1725 births
1778 deaths
People from Grabow
House of Mecklenburg-Schwerin
Dukes of Mecklenburg-Schwerin
Sons of monarchs
Non-inheriting heirs presumptive